Tekija can refer to:

Khanqah or tekke, a type of Islamic religious building
Tekija, Ilinden, a village in North Macedonia
Tekija (Kladovo), a village in Serbia on the Danube
Tekija (Kruševac), a village in Serbia near Kruševac
Tekija (Paraćin), a village in Serbia